Pamukkale, meaning "cotton castle" in Turkish, is a natural site in Denizli Province in southwestern Turkey. The area is famous for a carbonate mineral left by the flowing of thermal spring water. It is located in Turkey's Inner Aegean region, in the River Menderes valley, which has a temperate climate for most of the year.

It can be seen from the hills on the opposite side of the valley in the town of Denizli, 20 km away. This area has been drawing visitors to its thermal springs since the time of classical antiquity. The Turkish name refers to the surface of the shimmering, snow-white limestone, shaped over millennia by calcite-rich springs. Dripping slowly down the mountainside, mineral-rich waters collect in and cascade down the mineral terraces, into pools below.

It was added as a UNESCO World Heritage Site in 1988 along with Hierapolis.

Geology

Pamukkale's terraces are made of travertine, a sedimentary rock deposited by mineral water from the hot springs. When the water, supersaturated with calcium carbonate, reaches the surface, carbon dioxide de-gasses from it, and calcium carbonate is deposited. Calcium carbonate is deposited by the water as a soft gel which eventually crystallizes into travertine.

Archaeology

There are only a few historical facts known about the origin of the city. No traces of the presence of Hittites or Persians have been found. The Phrygians built a temple, probably in the first half of the 7th century BC. This temple, originally used by the citizens of the nearby town of Laodicea, would later form the centre of Hierapolis.

Hierapolis was founded as a thermal spa early in the 2nd century BC within the sphere of the Seleucid Empire. Antiochus the Great sent 2,000 Jewish families to Lydia and Phrygia from Babylon and Mesopotamia, later joined by more from Judea. The Jewish congregation grew in Hierapolis and has been estimated as high as 50,000 in 62 BC. Hierapolis became a healing centre where doctors used the thermal springs as a treatment for their patients. The city began minting bronze coins in the 2nd century BC. These coins give the name Hieropolis. It remains unclear whether this name referred to the original temple (hieron) or honoured Hiera, the wife of Telephus, son of Heracles and the Mysian princess Auge. This name eventually changed into Hierapolis ("holy city"),. In 133 BC, when Attalus III died, he bequeathed his kingdom to Rome. Hierapolis thus became part of the Roman province of Asia. In AD 17, during the rule of Emperor Tiberius, a major earthquake destroyed the city.

Through the influence of the Christian Apostle Paul, a church was founded here while he was at Ephesus. The Christian Apostle Philip spent the last years of his life here. The town's Martyrium was alleged to have been built upon the spot where Philip was crucified in AD 80. His daughters were also said to have acted as prophetesses in the region. During the 4th century, the Christians filled Pluto's Gate (a ploutonion) with stones, suggesting that Christianity had become the dominant religion and had begun displacing other faiths in the area. Originally a see of Phrygia Pacatiana, the Byzantine Emperor Justinian raised the bishop of Hierapolis to the rank of metropolitan in 531. The Roman baths were transformed to a Christian basilica. During the Byzantine period, the city continued to flourish and also remained an important centre for Christianity.

Museum
The museum contains historical artifacts from Hierapolis, as well as those from Laodiceia, Colossae, Tripolis, Attuda and other towns of the Lycos (Çürüksu) valley. The museum also has a section devoted to artifacts found at Beycesultan Hüyük that includes examples of Bronze Age craft. Artifacts from the Caria, Pisidia and Lydia regions are also on display. The museum's exhibition space consists of three closed areas of the Hierapolis Bath and the open areas in the eastern side which are known to have been used as the library and gymnasium. The artifacts in open exhibition space are mostly marble and stone.

World heritage site

Pamukkale is recognized as a World Heritage Site together with Hierapolis. Hierapolis-Pamukkale was made a World Heritage Site in 1988. It is a tourist attraction because of this status and its natural beauty.

Sister cities
The city of Pamukkale has two sister cities:
  Eger, Hungary
  Las Vegas, United States

Similar places
These locations are also well known for their travertine formations:
Badab-e Surt in Iran
Mammoth Hot Springs in the United States
Pink and White Terraces in New Zealand
Hierve el Agua in Mexico
Bagni San Filippo in Siena, Italy
Baishuitai in China
Tatev in Armenia
Terme di Saturnia in Italy
Huanglong Scenic and Historic Interest Area in Sichuan, China

Notes

Further reading
Turkey's mysterious portal to the underworld - BBC

External links

 Pamukkale official site
 
 Pamukkale - spherical panorama 360 degree
 UNESCO World Heritage site datasheet
 The Marble Stairs of Heaven on Earth: Pamukkale
  Hierapolis-Pamukkale at NASA Earth Observatory 
 Video from Pamukkale (4k, UltraHD)
 Top Tips For Visiting Pamukkale In The Summer

Archaeological sites in the Aegean Region
Articles containing video clips
Denizli
Hot springs of Turkey
World Heritage Sites in Turkey
Geography of Denizli Province
Landforms of Denizli Province
Tourist attractions in Denizli Province
Protected areas of Turkey
Pamukkale District
First 100 IUGS Geological Heritage Sites